Narine Karakashian (born 30 June 1971) is an Armenian chess player holding the title of Woman International Master (WIM). She is also a psychologist.

Career
Karakashian competed at the 30th Chess Olympiad for Armenia. She also represented the Armenian SSR at the 2nd Soviet Women's Team Chess Championship 1991.

Personal life
Her mother is Nonna Karakashyan, who was also a chess player and the first Armenian woman awarded with FIDE title of International Arbiter. Both mother and daughter were awarded with International chess titles (IA and WIM, correspondingly) at the same FIDE Congress in Manila, Philippines in 1992.

References

External links
 
 
 
 Narine Karakashian at Redhotpawn.com
 

1971 births
Living people
Chess Woman International Masters
Armenian female chess players
Chess Olympiad competitors